Töretam is a station on the main Moscow to Tashkent railway, located in Kazakhstan. The name means "Töre's grave" in the Kazakh language. Töre, or more formally, Töre-Baba, was a noble and descendant of Genghis Khan. Töretam is near the Baikonur Cosmodrome, a Russianformerly Sovietspaceport, and near the city of Baikonur (formerly Leninsk), which was constructed to service the cosmodrome.

History
In the mid-1950s, the Soviet Union announced that space activities were being conducted from the Baikonur Cosmodrome, which was assumed to be near the city of Baiqongyr, in the Kazakh SSR. At a press conference for the Apollo-Soyuz Test Project, Jules Bergman of ABC News said,
Baikonur, if you'll look on the coordinates, is 135 miles [217 km] away or something. Tyuratam may only be a railhead, but it is the Tyuratam Launch Complex. They call it Baikonur, I know. . . . I'm going to call it Tyuratam. ABC is going to call it Tyuratam. SAC Strategic Air Command calls it Tyuratam.
Deke Slayton mentioned that if they really wanted to use the name the Soviets commonly used, they would have to say Baikonur. Although it is likely that the Soviets originally called it Baikonur to hide its location, the Baikonur Cosmodrome quickly surpassed the original village of Baiqongyr's fame and importance. The city that was founded to the south of Töretam to support the cosmodrome, named Leninsk by the Soviets, came to be more frequently referred to as Baikonur. In 1995, following the dissolution of the Soviet Union, its name was even officially changed to Baiqongyr ('Baikonur' in Russian). 

The CIA tried to locate this launch site by systematically tracking over the major rail networks of the Soviet Union in Central Asia with U-2 spy planes. The site was discovered and photographed in 1957. Francis Gary Powers was scheduled to fly over it on his ill-fated mission in 1960. A Russian source has speculated incorrectly that he may have avoided Töretam after detecting the guidance radar of the defending SA-2 missile battery.  At that time U-2 pilots had no real-time SAM radar warning. In fact Powers was off track due to navigational inaccuracy caused by a delayed take-off which rendered his pre-computed astronavigation fixes inaccurate, and cloud cover which hampered visual track correction. It also prevented him from photographing the site. He was later shot down over Sverdlovsk.

References

Further reading

External links
Map

Populated places in Kazakhstan
Populated places in Kyzylorda Region